(born July 26, 1960) is a Japanese voice actress best known for her voice work on Soreike! Anpanman.

Anime roles
Bonobono (TV) as Fennec Kitsune-kun
Detective Conan (TV) as Kaneda Kanami (ep. 214)
Mobile Fighter G Gundam (TV) as Min
Mobile Suit Gundam Seed (TV) as Erica Simmons
Mobile Suit Gundam Seed Destiny (TV) as Erica Simmons
Mobile Suit Victory Gundam (TV) as Brasta Jellines; Elischa Kransky
Saint Seiya (TV) as Tatsuya
Soreike! Anpanman (TV and movies) as Currypanman
Fuichin-san (OVA) as Fuichin

Video games
Bushido Blade - Mikado

Tokusatsu
Gekisou Sentai Carranger - LL Onene

External links

Japanese voice actresses
Living people
Place of birth missing (living people)
1960 births